Tatiana Stepa (April 21, 1963 – August 7, 2009) was a Romanian folk singer. 

Born in Lupeni, she attended the High School for Architecture in Bucharest and made her debut in 1982 with Cenaclul Flacăra at the Făgăraș stadium.

Stepa died at the Military Hospital in Bucharest after a long illness due to cervical cancer, and was buried in the city's Bellu Cemetery.

External links

References

1963 births
2009 deaths
People from Lupeni
Romanian folk singers
20th-century Romanian women singers
20th-century Romanian singers
Deaths from cancer in Romania
Deaths from cervical cancer
Burials at Bellu Cemetery